Kristína Schmiedlová (born 6 August 1997) is a Slovak former tennis player. Her older sister Anna Karolína Schmiedlová is an active tennis player.

Schmiedlová won two singles titles on the ITF Circuit. On 13 July 2015, she reached her best singles ranking of world No. 412. On 25 April 2016, she peaked at No. 507 in the WTA doubles rankings.

As a junior, Schmiedlová reached the final of the 2014 Wimbledon Girls' Singles Championship, where she lost to future French Open winner Jeļena Ostapenko.

Playing for Slovakia at the Fed Cup, Schmiedlová has a win–loss record of 0–1.

Her last match on the circuit has been in February 2018 when she lost in the final qualification round of an ITF event in Grenoble.

ITF Circuit finals

Singles: 6 (2–4)

Doubles: 1 (0–1)

Junior Grand Slam finals

Girls' singles

References

External links

 
 
 

1993 births
Living people
Sportspeople from Košice
Slovak female tennis players
Tennis players at the 2014 Summer Youth Olympics
21st-century Slovak women